Gregg (formerly, Greenleaf) is an unincorporated community in Madera County, California.

The Greenleaf post office operated from 1904 to 1905. The Gregg post office opened in 1917, closed for a period in 1928, and closed for good in 1931.

References

Unincorporated communities in California
Unincorporated communities in Madera County, California